Transmembrane protein 57 is a protein that in humans is encoded by the TMEM57 gene.

References

Further reading